Michael A. Riffel Catholic High School is a Catholic high school in Regina, Saskatchewan, Canada. It was established in 1985 and is part of the Regina Catholic School Division.

It opened to cater to the city's then-rapidly growing northwest quadrant, and to alleviate the congestion at Archbishop M.C. O'Neill High School. It was named in honor of Mr. Michael A. Riffel, former trustee of the Regina Catholic School Division. The school originally opened with 145 students and has grown to over 800 students.

The school's athletics are known as the Royals and has four feeder elementary schools: St. Bernadette School, St. Jerome School, St. Josaphat School, and St. Nicholas School.

Notable alumni
 Chris Kunitz, National Hockey League player
 Chandler Stephenson, National Hockey League Player

References

External links
 

High schools in Regina, Saskatchewan
Catholic secondary schools in Saskatchewan
Educational institutions established in 1985
1985 establishments in Saskatchewan